P Chandrasekhar, popular by the screen name PC Sekhar is an Indian film writer and a director. His directorial was a Tamil movie Kadhalae en Kadhalae which got released in 2006. He rose to fame in Sandalwood (Kannada film industry) with the movie Nayaka which got released in 2010.

Career
PC Sekhar did make a strong debut with Kadhale en Kadhale which won the best movie in category of "portrayal of women in good light". Later he made Kannada industry as his home with the debut of the Naayaka. He went on to direct comic dramas like Romeo (2012), ChaddiDhosth (2013) and also thrillers like Arjuna (2015). The 2017 released Raaga depicted a love story between two blind persons.

Personal life
He has a Bsc degree (Physics, chemistry and Mathematics) from St. Joseph’s college and a MCA degree from Alliance Business Academy. His Father’s name is A.P. Paul Durai and his mother’s name is Krishna Selvathy. He has four siblings. While his elder brother P Mari Kumar is a software professional, his younger brother P Ramesh Kumar is the producer of three of his movies (Kadhalae en kadhalae, Naayaka, Romeo ). Two sister.

He married Meghana in 2017.

Entry to filmdom
While as a student, PC Sekhar had no big dreams of entering tinsel world, a life changing event did occur when he was pursuing his degree. One of his brothers-in-law Rajendran being an actor, it so happened that PC Sekhar visited the Vikram-Soorya starrer Pitamagan shooting spot and got captivated by film-making. Eventually he made a couple of short films Ne Yen Nanban da (You are my Friend) and My Imagination (silent movie). Both these short films were critically acclaimed in some of the film festivals. This naturally boosted not only his confidence, but even his family begin to dream big on the director in him. This implied that the brother himself started producing his initial movies.

Filmography

References

External links
 
  PC Shekhar biography at BookMyShow
 PC Shekar gets married
 PC Shekar Biography, Movies at FilmySphere

Year of birth missing (living people)
Living people
Screenwriters from Bangalore
Film directors from Bangalore
Kannada film directors
Kannada screenwriters
21st-century Indian film directors
Tamil film directors